Philippines competed at the 2019 World Aquatics Championships in Gwangju, South Korea from 12 to 28 July. Four swimmers coached by Sherwin Santiago competed for the Philippines in the championships.

In this edition of the championships, Remedy Rule broke the Philippine national record for the women’s 100-meter butterfly set by Jasmine Alkhaldi (1:01.00) in the 2015 Southeast Asian Games.

Swimming

Philippines entered four swimmers.

Men

Women

Mixed

References

Nations at the 2019 World Aquatics Championships
Philippines at the World Aquatics Championships
2019 in Philippine sport